was a Japanese weightlifter who won a bronze medal at the 1964 Summer Olympics and a silver medal at the 1968 Summer Olympics. He won two gold medals at the Asian Games in 1966 and 1970. He further became the world champion in the light-heavyweight category in 1969. In 1965–1969 Ouchi set eight world records – six in the snatch and two in the total. Later in life, Ouchi won four world titles in the masters category.

Ouchi was born in Kōriyama, Fukushima, Japan, on September 28, 1943. He took weightlifting as a student at Hosei University and an employee for the Tokyo Metropolitan Police Department. He died on June 6, 2011, at the age of 67.

References

1943 births
2011 deaths
Olympic weightlifters of Japan
Japanese male weightlifters
Olympic silver medalists for Japan
Olympic bronze medalists for Japan
People from Kōriyama
Weightlifters at the 1964 Summer Olympics
Weightlifters at the 1968 Summer Olympics
Asian Games medalists in weightlifting
Weightlifters at the 1966 Asian Games
Weightlifters at the 1970 Asian Games
Weightlifters at the 1974 Asian Games
Medalists at the 1968 Summer Olympics
Medalists at the 1964 Summer Olympics
Asian Games gold medalists for Japan
Medalists at the 1966 Asian Games
Medalists at the 1970 Asian Games
Sportspeople from Fukushima Prefecture
World Weightlifting Championships medalists
20th-century Japanese people
21st-century Japanese people